A stubber is a device on which one can stub out their cigarette or cigar. In the past, they often had "stubber" written on them and were used in buses. An other use are plane plates at bus stops and train or underground stations. The difference between an ashtray and a stubber is that a stubber is not able to contain the ash and usually is designed as a plane plate or an inclined rough surface. In February 1990, smoking was banned on the London Buses and following the stubbers in the buses came out of use. Today they are still in use on top or beside of public ashtrays.

References    

Smoking
Cigarettes